Woodend
is a town in Victoria, Australia. The town is in the Shire of Macedon Ranges local government area on Dja Dja Wurrung country and is bypassed to the east and north by the Calder Freeway (M79), located about halfway between Melbourne and Bendigo.

History

Woodend was first surveyed in 1836 by Major Thomas Mitchell, who opened it up for settlement. When gold was discovered in the area (towards Bendigo and Ballarat), Woodend became the main thoroughfare through the Black Forest, and accommodated many gold-diggers and their families. Woodend Post Office opened on the 20th of July 1854, however it closed shortly after, only to be reopened in one of the citizen's homes.

The Woodend Magistrates' Court closed on 1 January 1983.

Tourism and attractions
Woodend is close to such attractions as Mt Macedon and Hanging Rock located at nearby Newham, and numerous waterfalls. The area supports a large horse-racing community. Woodend's location in the foothills of the Great Dividing Range means that, unlike most of Australia, snowfalls are not uncommon.
The Woodend Winter Arts Festival, held on the Queen's Birthday Weekend in June, is an event where artisans from around Australia gather to perform. The annual Melbourne Autumn Day (MAD) ride is held in Woodend by the Melbourne Bicycle Touring Club. Woodend Children's Park in the centre of the town provides a meeting place for young and old, locals and visitors: A park to explore, to enjoy, to play. Woodend Children's Park opened behind the service station in October 2009.

The largest sporting group in the town is the Woodend Junior Football Club which incorporates 190 players, from 130 families, playing in 8 junior teams ranging from Under 9's to Under 16's. There are several mountain bike tracks near Woodend, in the Wombat State Forest and also on Mount Macedon. The local Wombat MTB Club maintains the tracks in the area and arrange events and bike tours.  Golfers play at the course of the Woodend Golf Club on Davy Street. The Woodend tennis club on Earnshaw St has 6 plexipave courts and its vibrant, progressive and rapidly growing membership has become a social hub for the local community.

The oldest church in Woodend is the Anglican Church of St Mary's, a Gothic bluestone building constructed in 1864. The church's stained glass windows were produced by William Montgomery (1850-1927), former president of the Victorian Artists Society. 
 
The events and news of the town are published in the town's community newsletter, The New Woodend Star, which publishes free archival copies of the newsletter online for reference.

A local Woodend Information Website is also available called Woodend Village News, this also has a local weather page, showing historical weather information. Including UV intensity, wind speed and direction, amount of rain, the maximum and minimum temperatures, along with wind chill and barometric pressure.

See also 

 Woodend railway station, Victoria
 Woodend/Hesket Football Club

References

External links 
 Woodend – Official tourism site
 Woodend Business & Tourism Association website

Towns in Victoria (Australia)
Shire of Macedon Ranges